The women's football (soccer) tournament at the 1999 Pan American Games was the inaugural edition of a women's football competition at Pan American Games. This first edition was held in Winnipeg between July 23 and August 7.

The tournament was won by the United States U18 team after beating Mexico 1–0 in the final.

The women's competition was held for the first time.

Group stage

Knockout stage

Semi finals

Bronze medal match

Gold Medal match

References

Football at the 1999 Pan American Games
1999
1999 in women's association football